Roca Partida ranks as the smallest of the four Revillagigedo Islands, part of the Free and Sovereign State of Colima in Mexico. The uninhabited island (Latitude 19° 0'2.53"N, Longitude 112° 4'5.35"W) encompasses an extremely small area. Many divers rank it among the most beautiful dive sites in Mexico. Divers must obtain permits from the Mexican Armed Forces to enter the military zone surrounding the island.

Geography

The four Revillagigedo Islands originated as volcanoes. San Benedicto Island and Socorro Island erupted in 1953 and 1993, respectively. Clarion Island and Roca Partida lack recently known eruptions. Erosion over millennia reduced Roca Partida to a piece of bare rock, devoid of terrestrial vegetation.

A low-lying bare rock area divides the two peaks, hence the name "Split Rock."

Fauna
Roca Partida lacks fresh water and supports no land animals. Nevertheless, the waters surrounding the islet teem with marine life. Several species of seabird breed on the rock, including the Nazca booby, which probably ventures little farther to the northeast; the Northeast Pacific brown booby; the East Pacific sooty tern, a doubtfully distinct subspecies; and the East Pacific brown noddy.

History
The island's first reported sighting was in November 1542 by the Spanish expedition of Ruy López de Villalobos, who charted it with its present-day name.

References

External links

 Marine Life of Roca Partida
 Scuba Diving in Roca Partida
 Information page with map

Revillagigedo Islands
Islands of Colima
Stacks (geology)
Volcanoes of Colima
Uninhabited islands of Mexico